Myo Myint Nyein is a journalist and political activist in Myanmar. He spent twelve years in prison for publishing a poem critical of the country's military rulers and for highlighting poor prison conditions in Myanmar.

Family
He was married to Daw Win Htay and has two sons and one daughter: Zar Ni Myo Myint Nyein, Bo Bo Myo Myint Nyein and Dari Myo Myint Nyein.

Arrest and detention 

In 1990, after having published the critical poem “What is happening!” by Min Lu, Nyein was arrested and sentenced to seven years imprisonment. In response, PEN International recognized him as an honorary member in 1990. His imprisonment was extended by a further seven years in 1996. due to his publishing a newsletter about prison conditions, in collaboration with other inmates. Subject to torture, he managed to send a letter written and signed with the blood of political prisoners to the World Conference on Human Rights (1993) held in Vienna, Austria about the violation of human rights in the prison.  Myo Myint Nyein organised many human rights movements in prison and was awarded the Freedom to Write Award by the Canadian Journalists for Freedom of Expression (CJFE) in 2001
 
As a consequence of a petition signed by journalists around the world and submitted to the Government of Myanmar by UN special rapporteur, Paulo Sergio Pinheiro, Nyein was released from Tharawaddy Prison on 13 February 2002. His release was welcomed by many journalists association and Human Rights Organizations.

Editor in Chief 
  
Since then he has been working as the Editor-in-charge of Shwe Essence Magazine. He worked as an editor of the Ray of Light Journal till August 2016. He was also the Editor-in-charge of the Teen monthly magazine from 2003 – 2013 till the Independence weekly Journal was launched in 2012. He was the editor of the Myanmar translation of 'the Glass Palace" written by Amitav Ghosh. It was translated into Burmese by Nay Win Myint Nay Win Myint and the book won the National Literature Award for translation in 2012.

With the country started relaxation of repression on writers in 2009, along with the original writer and translator, Myo Myin Nyein attended the "A freedom to Write Literary Festival" of the Brown University as a speaker. He was an Editor in Chief of the Echo Journal in 2014-2016 and has published the Info-Digest bi-monthly journal, a new style of news presentation in brief since 2016.

PEN Myanmar 
He was one of the founders of PEN Myanmar Center, a partner organisations of PEN International in 2013. Moreover, he was elected as a member of the board of PEN MM and acted as a treasurer till October 2016. He was re-elected to the board and entrusted as the President in December 2016

References 

Year of birth missing (living people)
Living people
Burmese journalists
Prisoners and detainees of Myanmar